Bayview Elementary School may refer to:

Bayview Elementary School (Saint John, New Brunswick), Canada
Bayview Elementary School (Vancouver, British Columbia), Canada
Bayview Elementary School (Fort Lauderdale, Florida), United States